Micah Arielle Zandee-Hart (born January 13, 1997) is a Canadian women's ice hockey player.

On November 23, 2016, she was named to the Canada women's national ice hockey team roster that competed against the United States in a pair of contests on December 13 (in Plymouth, Michigan) and December 20, 2016 (in Sarnia, Ontario). Hart is one of three members of the Canadian roster that will be making her debut with the national team in the series against the United States. Zandee-Hart outed herself as lesbian.

Playing career
While participating with Team British Columbia at the 2015 Canada Winter Games, Hart was named the province's flag bearer at the event.

Along with fellow British Columbia resident Sarah Potomak, Hart was invited to participate in the IIHF’s 2013 Women's High Performance Camp in Sheffield, England.

Hockey Canada
Hart was named Canada's captain for the 2015 IIHF World Women's U18 Championship.

With Canada's Under-22/Development Team, Hart captured a gold medal at the 2016 Nations Cup. Before the event, the team participated in a series of exhibition games against the national teams of Austria, the Czech Republic and Hungary. Hart registered an assist in the December 30, 2015, game against Austria.

On January 11, 2022, Zandee-Hart was named to Canada's 2022 Olympic team.

NCAA
During her freshman season (2015–16) with the Cornell Big Red, Hart ranked third in team scoring while leading all blueliners with 18 points on the strength of 17 assists.

Statistics

NCAA

Statistics source

Awards and honours

Hockey Canada
Media All-Star Team, 2015 IIHF World Women's U18 ChampionshipsSource: IIHF.com

NCAA
ECAC Hockey All-Rookie Team (2016) 
All-Ivy Honorable Mention (2016)

References

External links

1997 births
Living people
Canadian expatriate ice hockey players in the United States
Canadian women's ice hockey defencemen
Cornell Big Red women's ice hockey players
Ice hockey people from British Columbia
Professional Women's Hockey Players Association players
Ice hockey players at the 2022 Winter Olympics
Olympic ice hockey players of Canada
Medalists at the 2022 Winter Olympics
Olympic gold medalists for Canada
Olympic medalists in ice hockey
Canadian LGBT sportspeople
Lesbian sportswomen
LGBT ice hockey players